Matthew Caldwell, (March 8, 1798 – December 28, 1842), also spelled Mathew Caldwell was a 19th-century Texas settler, military figure, Captain of the Gonzales – Seguin Rangers and a signer of the Texas Declaration of Independence. Because of his recruitment ride ahead of the Battle of Gonzales, some call him the Paul Revere of Texas.

Early life and family
Matthew Caldwell, nicknamed "Old Paint", was born in Kentucky on March 8, 1798. He moved to Missouri with his family in 1818, where he traded, fought and learned the ways of the Indians. He, his wife, and family arrived in Texas in the Green DeWitt Colony on February 20, 1831. On June 22, 1831, he received the title to a parcel of land near the Zumwalt Settlement, southwest of current Hallettsville, Texas. Settling in Gonzales, Caldwell acquired the original James Hinds residence on Water Street and soon became a person of notoriety, involved in security and command of minutemen rangers in Gonzales and the surrounding areas.

Texas Revolution

Actively recruiting before the battle of Gonzales in October 1835, he rode from Gonzales to Mina informing colonists of the dire need of their support in the volunteer army. Because of this, some call him the Paul Revere of Texas.  As a participant at the battle, he served as a scout and mediator. On Nov. 3, 1835, the delegates of the citizens of Texas established the provisional Texas government by the Consultation of 1835. The Consultation authorized the recruitment of 25 Rangers, and later, was increased to three companies of 56 men each. Caldwell was appointed a subcontractor to the Texian Army by the Provisional Government of Texas, to supply and administer a volunteer army at the siege of Bexar and the Alamo.

On 1 February 1836, he and John Fisher were elected delegates from Gonzales to the Texas Independence Convention of 1836 at Washington on the Brazos, and both were signers of the Texas Declaration of Independence, on March 2. The convention appointed a committee of three, of which Caldwell was a member, to assess the situation of the enemy on the frontier and the condition of the Texian army. They dispatched couriers with the message of independence. Caldwell went along with them, paying close attention to the state of the new republic as they passed through numerous settlements.

On February 4, 1836, Matthew Caldwell was named, along with Byrd Lockhart and William A. Matthews, as commissioners to raise a group of volunteers for a Gonzales Ranging Company. The company was mustered by March 23, 1836. The muster list of 23 rangers is shown here.

Officers
Capt. Byrd Lockhart,
Lt. George C. Kimble,
First Sergeant William A. Irvin

Privates
John Ballard, John Davis, Andrew Duvalt, Jacob Darst, Frederick C. Elm, Galba Fuqua, William Fishbaugh, John Harris, Andrew J. Kent, David B. Kent, John G. King, Daniel McCoy, Jesse McCoy, Prospect McCoy, Isaac Millsaps, William Morrison, James Nash, Marcus L. Sewell, William Summers, Robert White

After the call for reinforcements from Lt. Col. William B. Travis by way of courier Captain Albert Martin on February 25, Lt. George C. Kimble responded on the 27th with twelve of the original rangers. Twenty more men joined on their ride to the Alamo.

1836 Alamo relief force
The Gonzales Ranging Company of Mounted Volunteers company primarily consisted of family men from Gonzales and DeWitt's Colony, gathering after the call for support was issued. After receiving Travis's "To the People of Texas and All Americans in the World" appeal on February 25, the Gonzales Rangers departed the town of Gonzales on the evening of Saturday, February 27, led by commanding officer Lieutenant George C. Kimble and Captain Albert Martin, the Alamo courier delivering Travis's appeal at Gonzales. Of the twenty-three original members mustered into the Gonzales Ranger Company on the 23rd, a total of twelve are thought entered the Alamo with the final Relief Force on March 1, and all but one died there.  Lockhart, Sowell, John William Smith and others accompanied the thirty-two Rangers into the Alamo and later departed, at night, as other couriers left.

According to one account, a group of twenty-five men left Gonzales at two in the evening on the 27th. As they passed through Green Dewitt's Colony toward the Umphries Branch community and on to the Cibolo Creek, the company gained eight more members, increasing the company to thirty-two men. The youngest member of the Alamo defenders, William Philip King, 16-years old, became a part of this group. Due to family illness, he substituted in his father's place. On the 29th, the group searched to find a way into the Alamo and through the Mexican lines. At three o'clock, in the early hours of March 1, they made a wild dash into the fort while shot at by Alamo sentries. One man was slightly wounded, and, after a few rash words, the Alamo gates flew open for the Gonzales force to enter.

The list of the 32 immortals are:
Isaac G. Baker,
John Cain,
George Washington Cottle,
David P. Cummings,
Jacob Darst,
John Davis,
Squire Daymon (Damon),
William Dearduff,
Charles Despallier,
William Fishbaugh,
John Flanders,
Dolphin Ward Floyd,
Galba Fuqua,
John E. Garvin,
John E. Gaston,
James George,
Thomas J. Jackson,
John Benjamin Kellogg II,
Andrew Kent,
George C. Kimble,
William Philip King,
Jonathan L. Lindley,
Albert Martin ,
Jesse McCoy,
Thomas R. Miller,
Isaac Millsaps,
George Neggan,
Marcus L. Sewell,
William Summers,
George Washington Tumlinson,
Robert White,
Claiborne Wright.

Knowing their chance of survival was slim, the Gonzales Rangers remained in the Alamo, serving as possibly the only reinforcements to make it into the Alamo during the siege.  The 1836 Gonzales Ranging Company of Mounted Volunteers all perished in the battle of the Alamo. For their efforts to support the besieged and outnumbered Texians, they are remembered as the "Immortal Thirty-Two".

Republic years
In the fall of 1837, after the revolution, settlers returned to Gonzales. Nothing remained of the former town except one charred building. The Comanche re-established their claim to the area. Caldwell served as the first Law Enforcement Official or Sheriff of Gonzales (Guadalupe, Dewitt, Caldwell, Lavaca) County.

City Founders

In 1838, he and his fellow rangers founded the town of Walnut Branch in sparsely-populated northwest Gonzales County. The area was well-favored, and was frequently DeWitt ranger campground years before the revolution.

1838 frontier rangers

Caldwell formed a frontier ranger company of twenty-nine men. Charles Lockhart became First Lieutenant, and Robert Hall joined as his Second Lieutenant. They built a log fort to provide security for the residents, and only mustered for a real crisis. In October that year, Native Americans raided the town, and stole two young women and some children, The rangers pursued the group, but could not catch them. They allied with friendly Native Americans, and valued their support.

Frontier defender

Rumors of a Mexican retaliation soon flourished, and Texas President Mirabeau B. Lamar appointed Caldwell, on January 15, 1839, as a captain, to recruit a company of Gonzales Rangers to defend the Texas frontier. Two months later, he had his company of rangers, and on March 23, 1839, Caldwell became captain of a company in the First Regiment of Infantry of Texas. On March 29, 1839, a company of eighty men commanded by General Edward Burleson defeated Vicente Córdova and his rebels during a fight near Seguin, Texas, at "Battleground Prairie". Córdova survived, but was pursued by Caldwell's Rangers, Seguin militia, and then, joined by members of the Henry Karnes company, insuring his departure from Texas.

Caldwells Gonzales & Seguin Rangers 1839

During this time, 1st Lt. James Campbell was stationed at the Seguin outpost with half of the Caldwell Rangers, providing protection for the new town and others stationed close to Gonzales.
The officers of the Rangers were:
Captain Matthew Caldwell,
1st Lt. James Campbell,
2nd Lt. Canah C. Colley,
1st Sergt. George D. Miller,
2nd Sergt. John R. King,
3rd Sergt. William N. Henry,
4th Sergt. John Archer.
The privates were:
M. L. Baber,
Seth Baldridge,
Nathan Burgett,
Curtis Caldwell,
William Clinton,
James M. Day,
Miles G. Dikes,
A. S. Emmitt,
James Forrester,
Daniel Gray,
John B. Gray,
Thomas Grubbs,
Frederick W. Happle,
Everett H. Harris,
Vaughter Henderson,
David Henson,
John S. Hodges,
Maury Irvin,
E. R. Jones,
William H. Killin,
Henry B. King,
Henry Eustace McCulloch,
T. N. Minter,
G. H. Nichols,
George W. Nichols,
James W. Nichols,
John W. Nichols,
Sol. G. Nichols,
Thomas R. Nichols,
William S. Osbourne,
James Pinchback,
D. M. Poore,
William Putman,
David Reynolds,
Abram Roberts,
Alexander Roberts,
James B. Roberts,
Jeremiah Roberts,
Russell, D. W.
Russell, John H.
Ezekiel Smith,
French Smith,
William Smith,
A. J. Sowell,
Asa J. L. Sowell,
J. N. Sowell,
John S. Stump,
James A. Swift,
T. W. Symonds,
Nathan Wadkins,
Isaac Wallace,
John D. Wolfin

1840s defense and imprisonment

Native Americans continued to plague the new Republic and in March, Caldwell participated in a meeting to trade captives with the Comanches. However, participants in the meeting turned violent, and the Council House Fight erupted, where he was wounded. He recovered in time to lead a company at the battle of Plum Creek on August 12, 1840.

As captain of Company D of the scouting force in the Texan Santa Fe Expedition in 1841, he was captured with other members, and imprisoned in Mexico. After he was released by the Mexicans, he headed to San Antonio to confront the invading Mexican forces there.

On September 18, 1842, Caldwell commanded a force of 200 men from Gonzales, Seguin, San Antonio and other near settlements, confronting and defeating General Adrián Woll, at the battle of Salado Creek.

Personal life and death
In 1826, Mathew was 28, he married Martha A, and they had three children. Martha died about 1833 in Gonzales, TX.

Their 3 children:
 Curtis (1827)
 Lucy Ann (1829–1906)
 Martha Elizabeth (1831–1892)

On May 17, 1837, Mathew was 39, he married Hannah Morrison in Washington County, Texas.

Matthew Caldwell died at his home in Gonzales on December 28, 1842, and was buried with honors as a military hero.

Legacy
Caldwell County, Texas was established in 1848 and named in his honor. In 1930, he was honored by the state of Texas with a monument at his grave at Gonzales. The 1936 Texas Hall of State Building, in Dallas, commemorates Caldwell on the exterior historical-figure frieze.

See also
 Timeline of the Republic of Texas
 Córdova Rebellion
 Council House Fight
 Great Raid of 1840
 Battle of Plum Creek

References

Citations

 

1798 births
1842 deaths
American city founders
People of the Texas Revolution
Texas–Indian Wars
Battles involving the Republic of Texas
People from Gonzales, Texas
People from Seguin, Texas
American pioneers
People of the American Old West
Signers of the Texas Declaration of Independence
Caldwell County, Texas